The Miss New Jersey USA competition is the pageant that selects the representative for the state of New Jersey in the Miss USA pageant. It is produced by D&D Productions.

New Jersey has yet to win the Miss USA title, although from 1989 to 1991 they had two 2nd runners-up and one 1st runner-up in a row.  Two years later, another Miss New Jersey USA placed in the finals, and in 2008, Tiffany Andrade finished as 2nd runner up, one of three Miss New Jersey USAs to place third at Miss USA. In the year 2017, 1st runner-up placement was achieved by Miss New Jersey USA 2017, Chhavi Verg. The most recent placement was Gina Mellish in 2020, placing Top 10.

Five Miss New Jersey USA titleholders have held the Miss New Jersey Teen USA title and two have competed at Miss America.

Derby Chukwudi of Hoboken was crowned Miss New Jersey USA 2023 on March 19, 2023. She will represent New Jersey for the title of Miss USA 2023.

Gallery of titleholders

Results summary

Placements
1st runners-up: Charlotte Ray (1991), Chhavi Verg (2017)
2nd runners-up: Deborah Lee Husti (1989), Karin Hartz (1990), Tiffany Andrade (2008)
Top 6: Amy Fissel (1993)
Top 10/12: Ruth Jane Hampton (1952), Cathy Russell (1975), Juanita McCarty (1977), Jennifer Makris (1997), Michelle Leonardo (2012), Alexa Noone (2018), Gina Mellish (2020)
Top 15/20: Evelyn Orowitz (1954), Dolores Winfield (1956), Sandy Chudy (1960), Diane Gierson (1961), Barbara Richartz (1964), Emily Shah (2014)

New Jersey holds a record of 19 placements at Miss USA.

Awards
Miss Congeniality: Lisa Summeroury-Perry (1986), Charlotte Ray (1991)

Winners 
Color key

Note

References

External links
 Official Website

New Jersey
New Jersey culture
Women in New Jersey
1952 establishments in New Jersey
Recurring events established in 1952
Annual events in New Jersey